Clemmer is a surname. Notable people with the surname include:
 Ann Clemmer (born 1958), American political scientist and politician 
 David Clemmer, Canadian style expert
 David E. Clemmer (born 1965), American analytical chemist
 James Clemmer (died 1942), vaudeville and movie theater manager
 Mary C. Ames (born Mary Clemmer, 1831–1884), American author
Richard L. Clemmer (born ), American business executive